Phil Sogard (born April 6, 1933) is an American film and television director.

Career
Sogard was hired by Gloria Monty to be on the directing staff of ABC Daytime's General Hospital, which he directed for several years in the late 1980s and early 1990s. In 1992, Ken Corday hired him to join the directing team of NBC Daytime's soap opera Days of Our Lives.

Sogard is a member of the Directors Guild of America.

Filmography
 General Hospital
 Days of Our Lives
 Days of Our Lives' 35th Anniversary
 Days of Our Lives' Christmas

Awards
Daytime Emmy Awards:
1980 - Outstanding Direction for a Daytime Drama Series for General Hospital - Nominated.
1981 - Outstanding Direction for a Daytime Drama Series for General Hospital - Won.
1982 - Outstanding Direction for a Daytime Drama Series for General Hospital - Won.
1983 - Outstanding Direction for a Daytime Drama Series for General Hospital - Nominated.
1996 - Outstanding Drama Series Directing Team for Days of Our Lives - Nominated.
1997 - Outstanding Drama Series Directing Team for Days of Our Lives - Nominated.
1998 - Outstanding Drama Series Directing Team for Days of Our Lives - Nominated.
1999 - Outstanding Drama Series Directing Team for Days of Our Lives - Nominated.
2003 - Outstanding Drama Series Directing Team for Days of Our Lives - Nominated.
2006 - Outstanding Drama Series Directing Team for Days of Our Lives - Nominated.
2009 - Outstanding Drama Series Directing Team for Days of Our Lives - Nominated.

References

External links
 

1933 births
Living people
American television directors
American film directors
American soap opera directors